Edwin Hall (1855–1938) was an American physicist.

Edwin Hall may also refer to:
 Edwin Oscar Hall (1810–1883), American businessman and politician in the Kingdom of Hawaii
 Edwin Thomas Hall (1851–1923), British architect
 Edwin Cuthbert Hall (1874–1953), Australian physician and philanthropist
 Edwin Hall (trade unionist) (1895–1961), British trade union leader
 Edwin Arthur Hall (1909–2004), American politician
 Edwin R. Hall, a man convicted for the murder of Kelsey Smith in 2007